Owls Head is an historic log cabin located on the shore of Newfound Lake in Hebron, New Hampshire. Built in 1927, it was added to the National Register of Historic Places in 2015.

See also

National Register of Historic Places listings in Grafton County, New Hampshire

References 

Log cabins in the United States
National Register of Historic Places in Grafton County, New Hampshire
Houses on the National Register of Historic Places in New Hampshire
Houses in Grafton County, New Hampshire
Hebron, New Hampshire